Alfred Ackroyd (29 August 1858 – 3 October 1927)  was an English amateur first-class cricketer, who played for Yorkshire County Cricket Club.

Ackroyd was born in Oakroyd Hall, Birkenshaw, Leeds, Yorkshire, England. He was a right-handed batsman and a right-arm fast bowler. He made two appearances for Yorkshire, and averaged 15 with the bat, and 10.66 with the ball taking three wickets. A fast bowler with a fierce break-back, his action was strongly criticised in Lillywhite's Companion for 1880.

Ackroyd died in Eccles, Lancashire, England, in October 1927, at the age of 59.

References

External links
Cricinfo Profile
Cricket Archive Statistics

1858 births
1927 deaths
English cricketers
People educated at Uppingham School
People from Birkenshaw, West Yorkshire
Cricketers from Yorkshire
Yorkshire cricketers